Afrixalus paradorsalis, also called Foulassi banana frog and the false striped spiny reed frog, is a species of frog in the family Hyperoliidae. It is native to Africa, where it occurs in Cameroon, Equatorial Guinea, Gabon, and Nigeria.

It is widely distributed and occurs in several types of habitat, including disturbed and degraded areas. It lays its eggs on foliage above pools, and the tadpoles drop into the water to develop.

References

paradorsalis
Frogs of Africa
Amphibians of Cameroon
Amphibians of Equatorial Guinea
Amphibians of Gabon
Amphibians of West Africa
Taxonomy articles created by Polbot
Amphibians described in 1960